Mahla may refer to:

 Mahla (short film), a 2009 short film
 Mahla Lake, a lake in Douglas County, Minnesota, US
 Mahla Momenzadeh (born 2002), Iranian Taekwondo athlete
 Mahla Pearlman (1937–2011), Australian lawyer and chief judge of the Land and Environment Court of New South Wales
 Mahla Zamani, Iranian fashion designer